The largest shrine of St Sebastian in the world, 
the church known as Arthunkal St. Andrew's Basilica and St. Sebastian's International Shrine in Arthunkal, Cherthala, Alappuzha district, Kerala, India, was constructed by waning just Portuguese missionaries in the 16th century. The grand annual feast of St Sebastian Arthunkal in January, which lasts for a month accompanied by millions of pilgrims is one of the important celebrations and major attractions in India.The feast of shrine Basilica also known as makaram perunnal. The church was rebuilt in 1584 under the vicar Jacomo Fenicio, an Italian Jesuit whose devotees claim to possess powers to heal the body and mind. Devotees fondly referred to him as "Arthunkal Veluthachan", "fair skinned father". Fenicio died in 1632. Eight years after his death, the church was rebuilt again, this time reoriented to face west towards the long white-sand beach on the shores of the Arabian Sea. In 1647, a statue of St. Sebastian, struck with arrows all over his bleeding body (he was executed on the order of the Roman emperor Diocletian for embracing the Christian faith) sculptured in Milan, was brought and placed in the Arthunkal church.

Arthunkal St Andrews Basilica, the first Parish of the Roman Catholic Diocese of Alleppey was elevated to the status of Basilica by Catholic Church authorities on 9 July 2010.

Arthunkal Basilica became the first Basilica in the diocese of Alleppey and the seventh basilica in Kerala and the third basilica of the Roman Catholic Latin church of Kerala.  ( Thumpoli (Thumpoly) Church, the second most important church in the Diocese of Alleppey , is expected to receive the status of the second `Minor Basilica´ in the Diocese.

Gallery

See also
 Arthunkal Veluthachan

References

Basilica churches in Kerala
Rebuilt churches in India
Churches in Alappuzha district
Roman Catholic churches completed in 1584
16th-century Roman Catholic church buildings in India